Polybius is a fictitious 1981 arcade game that is part of an urban legend. The legend describes the game as part of a government-run crowdsourced psychology experiment based in Portland, Oregon. Gameplay supposedly produced intense psychoactive and addictive effects in the player. These few publicly staged arcade machines were said to have been visited periodically by men in black for the purpose of data-mining the machines and analyzing these effects. Allegedly, all of these Polybius arcade machines disappeared from the arcade market.

This urban legend has persisted in video game journalism and through continued interest, and has inspired video games with the same name.

Legend

The urban legend says that in 1981, when new arcade games were uncommon, an unheard-of new arcade game appeared in several suburbs of Portland, Oregon. The game was popular to the point of addiction, with lines forming around the machines and often resulting in fights over who would play next. The machines were visited by men in black, who collected unknown data from the machines, allegedly testing responses to the game's psychoactive effects. Players supposedly suffered from a series of unpleasant side effects, including seizures, amnesia, insomnia, night terrors, and hallucinations. Approximately one month after its supposed release in 1981, Polybius is said to have disappeared without a trace.

The company named in most accounts of the game is Sinneslöschen. The word is described by writer Brian Dunning as "not-quite-idiomatic German" (a word constructed outside the norms of German-language usage and grammar) meaning "sense delete" or "sensory deprivation". If it was a German term of actual use, "Sinneslöschen" would be pronounced like . The word's meanings are derived from the German words Sinne ("senses") and löschen ("to extinguish" or "to delete"), though the way they are combined is not standard German; Sinnlöschen would be more correct.

The game has the same name as the classical Greek historian Polybius, born in Arcadia and known for his assertion that historians should never report what they cannot verify through interviews with eyewitnesses.

Origins
Due to the viral and anecdotal nature of the legend, an exact origin is unclear. Some anecdotal accounts claim that the legend originated on Usenet circa 1994, or earlier through offline word of mouth. The earliest confirmed record of the legend is an entry for the title added to arcade game resource coinop.org on February 6, 2000; although coinop.org lists the page as originating in 1998, journalist Stuart Brown states that it appears to have defaulted to that time due to a database error caused by a lack of input. The entry mentions the name Polybius and a copyright date of 1981. The author of the entry claims in the description to be in possession of a ROM image of the game, and to have extracted fragments of text from it, including "1981 Sinneslöschen". The remainder of the information about the game is listed as "unknown", and its "About the game" section describes the "bizarre rumors" that make up the legend.

Some time prior to September 2003, Kurt Koller, owner of coinop.org, submitted a message to the American video game magazine GamePro about Polybius. Polybius then appeared in the September 2003 issue of GamePro, as part of a feature story on video games called "Secrets and Lies". This is the first known printed mention of the game, exposing the legend to a mass-market audience. The article declared the existence of the game to be "inconclusive", helping to both spark curiosity and spread the story.

Following the appearance in GamePro magazine, several people claimed to have some involvement with Polybius. In 2006, a man named Steven Roach claimed he had been one of its original programmers and that his company developed a game with very intense and cutting-edge graphics. However, according to Roach, a boy experienced an epileptic seizure while playing, and the cabinets were withdrawn by the company in a panic. Although Roach offered no proof for his claims, his story added details on gameplay that later inspired Rogue Synapse's game based on the legend.

Analysis

The alleged original Polybius arcade game does not exist. Snopes.com, which catalogs urban legends, concludes the game is a modern-day version of 1980s rumors of "men in black". This led to the hypothesis that the government was hosting some sort of experiment and sending subliminal messages to the players. Magazines and mainstream news of the early 1980s make no mention of Polybius. Aside from the mockup cabinets and games inspired by the myth, no authentic cabinets or ROM dumps have ever been documented. Ben Silverman of Yahoo! Games remarked: "Unfortunately, there is no evidence that the game ever existed, no less turned its users into babbling lunatics ... Still, Polybius has enjoyed cult-like status as a throwback to a more technologically paranoid era."

Skeptics and researchers have differing ideas on when, how and why the story of Polybius began. American producer and author Brian Dunning believes Polybius to be an urban legend that grew out of a mixture of influences in the 1980s. He notes that two players fell ill in Portland on the same day in 1981, one collapsing with a migraine headache after playing Tempest, and another suffering from stomach pain after playing Asteroids for 28 hours in a filmed attempt to break a world record at the same arcade. Dunning records that the Federal Bureau of Investigation raided several video arcades in the area just ten days later, where the owners were suspected of using the machines for gambling, and the lead-up to the raid involved FBI agents monitoring arcade cabinets for signs of tampering and recording high scores. Dunning suggests that these two events were combined in an urban legend about government-monitored arcade machines making players ill. He believes that such a myth must have been established by 1984, and that it influenced the plot of the film The Last Starfighter, in which a teenager is recruited by aliens who monitor him playing a covertly-developed arcade game. Dunning considers "Sinneslöschen" to be the kind of name that a non-German speaker would generate if they tried to create a compound word using an English-to-German dictionary.

Internet writer Patrick Kellogg believes that players claiming to remember having played or seen Polybius as early as the 1980s may actually be recalling the video game Cube Quest. Cube Quest, released in arcades in 1983, is a shooting game which played from a laserdisc. Kellogg describes its visuals as "revolutionary" and far ahead of typical games of the time. He states that the game would be frequently visited for maintenance (because of frequent breakdowns of laserdisc players in arcade games) and was often removed from arcades after a short time for the same reason.

British filmmaker and video game journalist Stuart Brown concludes that the Polybius legend began no earlier than 2000, arguing against the purported 1980s origin for the myth. In his review of the legend's history, Brown states his conclusion that the Polybius story began as an intentional hoax in 2000 by Kurt Koller, owner of coinop.org, in order to drive traffic to his site. Brown states that he did not find any evidence of the Polybius myth existing until the year 2000, the same year Brown concludes marked the first appearance of the Polybius article on Koller's site. In Brown's view, the frequently-cited 1980s origin of the myth was an invented aspect written into the coinop.org description of the "legend" to make Koller's hoax more convincing. Brown further theorizes that people recalling discussion of Polybius on Usenet in 1994 were misremembering articles on the Pink Floyd-related Publius Enigma puzzle. Per Brown, the Polybius hoax capitalized on the popularity of conspiracy theories and the highly viral nature of other Internet hoaxes in, or just before, the year 2000.

Brown also notes striking similarities between the fonts used on the supposed title screen, provided by the image on coinop.org in 2000, and those used for two Williams Electronics arcade video games: Bubbles and Robotron: 2084.  He concludes that the 5-pixel text used for the credit counter is similar to that of Robotron: 2084 and that the font that reads "Sinneslöschen" is almost identical to that of Bubbles, with the only differences the appearance of the "O" and the mirror-image reversal of the "H" along a central vertical axis. Brown states that this could be the work of a copycat fan of Williams Electronics; both Bubbles and Robotron: 2084 were made by Williams and both were released only a year later than when Polybius was said to first appear.

Legacy

Polybius for Windows (2007)
In 2007, freeware developers and arcade constructors Rogue Synapse registered the domain "sinnesloschen.com" and offered a free downloadable game titled Polybius for Microsoft Windows. The game's design is partly based on a contested description of the Polybius arcade machine posted on a forum by an individual named Steven Roach who had claimed to have worked on the original. Rogue Synapse's Polybius is a 2D shooter resembling Star Castle.

To complete the illusion, Rogue Synapse's owner Dr. Estil Vance founded a Texas-based corporation bearing the name Sinnesloschen (without umlaut) in 2007. He transferred to it the "Rogue Synapse" trademark and a newly registered trademark on "Polybius". Its website says that it is an "attempt to recreate the Polybius game as it might have existed in 1981".

Polybius for PlayStation 4 (2017)

In 2016, Llamasoft announced a game called Polybius for the PlayStation 4 with support for the PlayStation VR, released on the PlayStation store on Tuesday, May 9, 2017. In early marketing, co-author Jeff Minter claimed to have been permitted to play the original Polybius arcade machine in a warehouse in Basingstoke, England. He later acknowledged that the game was inspired by the urban legend but does not attempt to reproduce its alleged gameplay.

In popular culture
In the first episode of Paper Girls (2022), Polybius runs on a home game console.

In the fifth episode of season 1 of the Loki television series (2021), when Loki is in The Void, a Polybius cabinet is seen in the background of the Loki variants' hideout.

See also
 List of urban legends
 Toynbee tiles

References

External links 
 The game's entry on coinop.org
 , includes alleged cabinet photograph
 7 Greatest Video Game Legends
 Polybius home page
 Article about the game in Atlas Obscura
 Eight minute documentary by the BBC

Arcade video games
Creepypasta
Fictional video games
Science and technology-related conspiracy theories
Urban legends
Video game hoaxes